Lethrinops longimanus is a species of cichlid endemic to Lake Malawi where it is found in deep waters  over sandy substrates.  This species grows to a length of  SL.

References

longimanus
Taxa named by Ethelwynn Trewavas
Fish described in 1931
Taxonomy articles created by Polbot